Neemri/Nimari/Nimri is a village in the Bhiwani district of the Indian state of Haryana. Nimari village is in the UTC 5.30 time zone and follows Indian standard time (IST). The local sunrise time varies 25 minutes from IST. The nearest railway station is Kharak Kalan (6 km). There is one government school in Haryana up to 10th standard and three other private schools. A govt college, hospital, market, bank and postal service are also available in the nearby town Baund Kalan (2 km from Nimari). A local temple is dedicated to the local deity, Dada Devta. Shiva and Gorakhnath are other deities having their own dedicated temples in the outer area of village. According to Census 2011 information, the location code or village code of Neemri village is 061460. As per 2009 stats, Nimri is the gram panchayat of Neemri village.

The total geographical area of village is 395 hectares. Neemri has a total population of 2,072. There are about 403 houses in Neemri village. As per 2019 stats, Neemri villages comes under Dadri assembly and Bhiwani-Mahendragarh parliamentary constituency. Bondkala is nearest town to Neemri. The female to male ratio of the village is 894/1000.

Gram Panchayat of Nimri Village

Name	Des. & Ward	
Manbir Singh	Sarpanch
Rajbir	Panch -1
Neelam	Panch -2
Nishu	Panch -3
Ramniwas	Panch -4
Sandeep	Panch -5
Sushila	Panch -6
Nauratan	Panch -7
Aashu	Panch -8
Kavita	Panch -9
Last updated: Feb 2016
Source: ECI

Villages in Bhiwani district